These are the international rankings of Switzerland.

Economy

World Economic Forum: Global Competitiveness Report  ranked 1 out of 133 (2010-2014)
World Intellectual Property Organization: Global Innovation Index  ranked 1 out of 143 (2014)
Legatum Institute: Prosperity Index  ranked 2 out of 142 (2014)
United Nations Development Programme:  Human Development Index ranked 2 out of 187 (2016)
International Monetary Fund: Income per capita in purchasing power parity ranked 7 out of 181 (2010) 
 Gallup World Poll: happiness  ranked 8 out of 155 (2009)
 U.S.News: Best Countries #1 in Overall Rankings (2018)

Military

Institute for Economics and Peace: Global Peace Index ranked 5 out of 162 (2014)

Politics

Transparency International: Corruption Perceptions Index ranked 8 out of 180 (2010)
Reporters Without Borders: Press Freedom Index ranked 1 out of 178 (2010)
The Economist:  Democracy Index ranked  8 out of 167 (2010)

Switzerland